Christian Union may refer to:

 Christian Union (Netherlands), a Dutch Christian democratic political party (ChristenUnie in Dutch)
 Christian Union (Slovakia), a Slovak Christian democratic political party (Kresťanská únia in Slovak)
 Christian Union (denomination), an evangelical Christian denomination in the mid-western U.S.
 Christian Union, a defunct American magazine published in New York from 1870 to 1893 before being renamed The Outlook
 Christian unions (student groups), Christian student group at universities or colleges

See also
 Churches of Christ in Christian Union, an evangelical Christian denomination in the U.S.